Kostas Poulis (28 October 1928 – 7 December 1986) was a Greek footballer who played as a midfielder. He competed in the men's tournament at the 1952 Summer Olympics.

Club career
Poulis, from a young age he loved football and AEK Athens, while he often watched training sessions of his favorite team. In 1943, during the occupation of Greece, he signed up for a team from his neighborhood, Treis Asteres and competed in the fields of the surrounding area. In 1945 after the end of the occupation,  AEK Athens youth coach Giorgos Daispangos was looking for talent to fill AEK and rebuild a strong team similar to the one that dominated the last three years before the war. In a training session, he saw Poulis doing tricks with the ball and invited him to train with the club, making his dream come true.

At first he was a substitute footballer, but in May 1948 the team played friendly matches in Thessaloniki and in the first game the team's left midfielder Isaggeleas was injured. In the next match against Iraklis, on 3 May Poulis takes his place making his debut in the men's team in a wins 3–0 victory. From that day on, Poulis occupied the position of the left midfielder in the starting eleven. Poulis had a huge career at AEK, where won the 3 Cups, as well as an Athens FCA Championship. In the summer of 1959 he was traded with his teammates Bounas, Teboneras, Valsamis and Kokkinidis to Propontis Chalkida in order for AEK to acquire the goalkeeper, Kimon Dimitriou. The following season he signed for Apollon Athens until 1961 when he ended his career.

International career
Poulis played for Greece in 9 matches, between 1950–1953. He was also an international with the military team, with which he also scored a goal.

Personal life
After the end of his career, Poulis was involved in coaching, at the same time he worked at the Water Company. In 1956 he played in the film "The aces of the pitch" (also known as "Sunday Heroes"), together with other important football players of the time, such as Andreas Mouratis, Lakis Petropoulos, Kostas Linoxilakis and Stathis Mantalozis. He died on 7 December 1986 of cancer at the age of 58. On 20 June 2022, his family donated to the then under-construction History museum of AEK Athens in the Agia Sophia Stadium, six medals from his sporting career, a tribute to his life and career since 1954, as well as a series of rare photographs.

Honours

AEK Athens
Greek Cup: 1948–49, 1949–50, 1955–56
Athens FCA Championship: 1950

References

External links

1928 births
1986 deaths
Greece international footballers
Olympic footballers of Greece
Footballers at the 1952 Summer Olympics
Footballers from Athens
Greek footballers
Association football defenders
AEK Athens F.C. players
Apollon Smyrnis F.C. players